Tidal Wave: No Escape is a 1997 American made-for-television disaster film directed by George T. Miller starring Corbin Bernsen, Julianne Phillips, Gregg Henry. It originally aired on ABC on Monday May 5, 1997.

Plot
A series of tidal waves bring chaos to the coast of California, prompting a navy scientist and an oceanographer to find the cause. They are not prepared for what they find and try to stop the person behind the man-made tidal waves.

Cast
Corbin Bernsen as John Wahl
Julianne Phillips as Jessica Weaver
Gregg Henry as Edgar Purcell
Larry Brandenburg as Frank Brisick
Lawrence Hilton-Jacobs as Marlan Clark

See also
Killer Wave, a 2007 miniseries with a similar plot and identically-named villain.

External links

1997 television films
1997 films
1990s disaster films
American disaster films
American television films
Films directed by George T. Miller
Sonar Entertainment films
1990s American films